Roswell Park Comprehensive Cancer Center is a cancer research and treatment center located in Buffalo, New York. Founded by surgeon Roswell Park in 1898, the center was the first in the United States to specifically focus on cancer research. The center is usually called Roswell Park in short form. The center, which conducts clinical research on cancer as well as the development new drugs, provides advanced treatment for all forms of adult and pediatric cancer, and serves as a member of the National Comprehensive Cancer Network. Roswell Park Comprehensive Cancer Center is currently the only upstate New York facility to hold the National Cancer Institute designation of "comprehensive cancer center".

The Roswell Park campus, spread out in 15 separate buildings of approximately two million square feet, occupies  on the  Buffalo Niagara Medical Campus (BNMC) in downtown Buffalo, and includes  of space equally distributed between clinical programs and research/education functions. A separate hospital building, completed in 1998, houses a diagnostic and treatment center. The campus also includes a medical research complex as well as research and education focused spaces.

History
In 1898, the program that would later become the cancer center was established by Roswell Park, who was a professor of surgery at the University of Buffalo School of Medicine. Park said that "Only through a deliberate well-planned, combined attack from various directions by means fitted for such work could real advances be made and further the relationship of laboratory work, clinical study and education must be closely associated."

Research started in three rooms in the University of Buffalo School of Medicine but not long thereafter, it outgrew the rooms. Seeing the importance of dedicated cancer research, select Buffalo citizens donated funds to purchase land and construct a new building. The largest contributor was Mrs. William Gratwick (wife of William H. Gratwick, the founder of Gratwick, Smith & Fryer Lumber Co.), who donated $25,000. The Gratwick Research Laboratory of the University of Buffalo was constructed in 1901 and was located at High and Elm streets.

Park wrote books, gave lectures, and was the administrator at the cancer research center. In 1904, Park stepped down and Harvey R. Gaylord took over as the center's second director. Park remained as the chairman of the board of trustees.

In coming decades the center was renamed the Roswell Park Cancer Institute, a name it retained for decades until 2018, when its current name was implemented. The Roswell Park Cancer Institute was usually called Roswell Park or RPCI for short.

Notable facts 
 Founded in 1898 as the world's first institute devoted exclusively to cancer research 1884 – On May 31, Memorial Sloan Kettering Cancer Center is founded as New York Cancer Hospital at 106th Street and Central Park West in Manhattan. New York Cancer Hospital is the first institution in the United States devoted exclusively to the treatment and research of cancer.
 Gerty Cori was the first woman to receive the Nobel Prize in Physiology or Medicine.
 The center's first female leader, Candace S. Johnson was named President & CEO in February 2015.
 Leads New York State in the number of robotic cystectomies performed
 Established one of the nation's first long-term survivors clinics for childhood cancer patients

Discoveries and advancements in cancer care

Discovery of how the human body converts glucose to glycogen 

Drs. Gerty and Carl Cori jointly won the 1947 Nobel Prize in Physiology or Medicine, "for their discovery of the course of the catalytic conversion of glycogen." Their research leading to the discovery began during their tenure at Roswell Park (then called the New York State Institute for the Study of Malignant Diseases), from 1922 to 1931.

Alternative breast cancer treatments 
Thomas Dao (1921–2009), served as director of the breast surgery department from 1957 to 1988, where he developed breast cancer treatment alternatives.

Development of photodynamic therapy 
In 1975, Dr. Thomas Dougherty successfully treated preclinical models of cancer using photodynamic therapy (PDT) techniques for the first time. In 1978, he conducted the first PDT clinical trial. Today, PDT is an FDA-approved method for treating specific kinds of cancer, and is used around the world.

Discovery of PSA 
Research resulting in the discovery of the prostate-specific antigen (PSA) was led by Dr. T. Ming Chu in the 1970s. His team subsequently developed a way to detect the PSA protein in blood as a simple diagnostic test. Since its FDA approvals in 1986 and 1994, an estimated one billion PSA tests have been given.

Research on 5-fluorouracil + leucovorin 
Biochemist Marie Hakala, PhD first observed that 5-fluorouracil becomes more effective in treating cancer cells when calcium leucovorin is added. This discovery paved the way for the development of 5-FU + leucovorin therapy, which was for many years the gold standard of chemotherapy for colorectal cancer.

Organization

Mission 
The mission of Roswell Park is to "eliminate cancer's grip on humanity by unlocking its secrets through personalized approaches and unleashing the healing power of hope".

Structure 
The Roswell Park Cancer Institute Corporation, which is the name of the New York State public-benefit corporation that operates the center, is guided by a 14-member board of directors (which has its own staff). The management team is headed by President and CEO Candace S. Johnson, PhD, who reports to the board. In 2017, it had operating expenses of $722.45 million, an outstanding debt of $189.67 million, and a staffing level of 2,919 people.

Reputation 
Roswell Park Comprehensive Cancer Center has received numerous accolades for the quality of healthcare provided.

 In 2020, Roswell Park ranked #14 on U.S. News & World Report's list of the best cancer hospitals in the country, and was ranked High Performing in the areas of colon cancer surgery and lung cancer surgery.
 Roswell Park has received recognition from Blue Cross Blue Shield as a Blue Distinction Center for Cancer Care, Blood and Marrow Transplants, and Cellular Immunotherapy.
 Roswell Park is recognized as an Age-Friendly Health System by the Institute for Healthcare Improvement.
 The American College of Radiology has recognized Roswell Park as a Breast Cancer Center of Excellence.
 Roswell Park is recognized as an Optum Cancer Center of Excellence.
 The Lung Cancer Alliance has recognized Roswell Park as a Screening Center of Excellence.
Roswell Park is certified as a Quality Oncology Practice Initiative by the American Society of Clinical Oncology.

Accreditation 

 Accreditation Council for Continuing Medical Education
 Accreditation Council for Graduate Medical Education
 American Dental Association - Dentistry and Maxillofacial Prosthetics
 Association for the Accreditation of Human Research Protection Programs
 Association for Assessment and Accreditation of Laboratory Animal Care International (AAALAC International)
 Association of American Blood Banks
 Cancer Immunotherapy Trials Network Member (CITN)
 Commission on Cancer Accredited Program - American College of Surgeons
 Foundation for the Accreditation of Cellular Therapy (FACT)
 Gold Seal of Approval - Joint Commission on Accreditation of Healthcare Organizations
 Palliative Care Certification - Joint Commission on Accreditation of Healthcare Organizations
 Laboratory Accreditation - Joint Commission on Accreditation of Healthcare Organizations
 National Cancer Institute-designated Comprehensive Cancer Center
 National Comprehensive Cancer Network Member Institution
 National Marrow Donor Program
 Society of Surgical Oncology - Surgical Oncology Training Program
 National Accreditation Program for Breast Cancers

Patient care

Roswell Park provides comprehensive care for a wide range of cancers.

 Adrenal Cancer
 Anal Cancer
 Bladder Cancer
 Brain Cancer
 Breast Cancer
 Cervical Cancer
 Chronic Lymphocytic Leukemia (CLL)
 Colon & Rectal Cancer
 Esophageal Cancer
 Fallopian Tube Cancer
 Gallbladder & Bile Duct Cancers
 Head & Neck Cancer
 Kidney Cancer
 Leukemia & Other Blood Disorders
 Liver Cancer
 Lung Cancer
 Lymphoma
 Mediastinal Tumors
 Melanoma
 Mesothelioma
 Multiple Myeloma
 Myelodysplastic Syndromes
 Neuroendocrine Tumors
 Ovarian Cancer
 Pancreatic Cancer
 Pediatric Cancer & Blood Disorders
 Penile Cancer
 Prostate Cancer
 Sarcoma & Other Soft Tissue Tumors
 Skin Cancers other than Melanoma
 Spinal Tumors
 Stomach Cancer
 Testicular Cancer
 Thymus Cancer
 Thyroid & Parathyroid Cancer
 Undiagnosed Cancers
 Urethral Cancer
 Uterine & Endometrial Cancer
 Vaginal Cancer
 Vulvar Cancer

Specialized treatments 
Roswell Park offers specialized treatments, services and therapies to treat cancer, as well as services to support patients undergoing cancer treatment.

 Advanced Endoscopy
 Anesthesiology & Critical Care Medicine
 Balloon Kyphoplasty
 Blood Bank/Plateletpheresis
 BMT & Cellular Therapy
 3-D Brain Mapping
 Cancer Pain Management Service
 Dentistry and Maxillofacial Prosthetics
 Experimental Therapeutics
 Follow-up Clinic for Long-term Survivors of Childhood Cancer
 Genetic Screening, Counseling, and DNA Banking
 Clinical Trials
 Community Cancer Resource Center
 Diagnostic Radiology
 Gamma Knife
 High-Risk Breast Cancer Program
 High-Risk Lung Cancer Program
 High-Risk Ovarian Cancer Program
 High-Risk Pancreas Cancer Program
 Minimally Invasive Surgical Suite
 Immunotherapy
 Integrative Medicine
 Interventional Pulmonology
 Interventional Radiology
 Mohs Surgery
 Nuclear Medicine
 Nursing
 Pathology & Laboratory Medicine
 Patient Advocates & Social Workers
 Personalized Medicine
 Photodynamic Therapy
 Psychosocial Support
 Radiation Oncology
 Rehabilitation Services including physical, occupational and speech therapy
 Robotic Surgery
 Tobacco Cessation Resources
 Women's and Men's Sexual Health Clinics for Cancer Survivors

Collaborations

CIMAvax 
Roswell Park was the first American institution to receive FDA permission to conduct clinical trials of CIMAvax, a Cuban medical therapy developed by Centro de Immunologica Molecular, La Habana, Cuba.

Ovarian Cancer SPORE 
The Ovarian Cancer SPORE is a collaboration between Roswell Park and University of Pittsburgh Cancer Institute (UPCI). The SPORE project includes multiple research projects, core supportive structures, and career development programs.

Cancer Registries

Stacey Scott Lung Cancer Registry
Together with the British Columbia Cancer Agency, Vancouver, Canada and Vrije Universiteit, Amsterdam, The Netherlands, Roswell Park manages the Stacey Scott Lung Cancer Registry.

Familial Ovarian Cancer Registry 
Founded in 1990 by Dr. Steven Piver, the Familial Ovarian Cancer Registry houses information relating to family history and lifestyle of patients and families with histories of ovarian cancer.

Research and training collaborations 
Roswell Park collaborates with institutions around the world to strengthen cancer training and research programs.

 Centro de Immunologia Molecular (CIM), Playa, La Habana, Cuba
 Debrecen Medical University, Debrecen, Hungary
 Children’s Cancer Institute in Australia, Sydney, Australia
 Institute of Materia Medica of Nanyang Normal University, China
 Jagiellonian University (JU), Kraków, Poland
 King Fahad Specialist Hospital, Dammam, Saudi Arabia
 Lakeshore Cancer Center (LCC), Lagos, Nigeria
 Maccabi Healthcare Services and University of Haifa, Israel
 National Research Center for Hematology, Moscow, Russia
 Pecs Medical University, Pecs, Hungary
 Queen Mary University of London, United Kingdom
 Semmelweis University, Budapest, Hungary
 University of Szeged Medical School, Szeged, Hungary
 University of Waterloo, Canada

See also

 Erie County Medical Center
 Nassau University Medical Center
 Westchester Medical Center University Hospital

References

External links 
 Roswell Park Comprehensive Cancer Center
 Roswell Park Alliance Foundation
 Buffalo Niagara Medical Campus
 Roswell Park Comprehensive Cancer Center Research and Education
 The Paint Box Project
 Courage of Carly Fund
 The Ride for Roswell
 Team Cure Challenge
 Yroswell for Generation Y
 Familial Ovarian Cancer Registry
 Roswell Park Cancer Connect community site

1898 establishments in New York (state)
Hospital buildings completed in 1998
Cancer organizations based in the United States
Hospitals in New York (state)
Healthcare in Buffalo, New York
Buildings and structures in Buffalo, New York
University at Buffalo
Medical research institutes in New York (state)
NCI-designated cancer centers